Sprinkling Tarn is a body of water at the foot of Great End, in the Southern Fells in Lake District,  from Seathwaite, Cumbria, England. It is noted for its trout and an introduced rare fish, vendace. Formerly known also as Sparkling Tarn.

References

Lakes of the Lake District
Allerdale